Praline (New Orleans, Cajun, and ) is a form of confection containing, at a minimum, culinary nuts – usually  almonds, pecans and hazelnuts – and sugar. Cream is a common third ingredient.

There are two main types:
 French pralines, a firm combination of almonds and caramelized sugar
 American pralines, a softer, creamier combination of syrup and pecans, hazelnuts or almonds with milk or cream, resembling fudge

A praline cookie is a chocolate biscuit containing ground nuts. Praline is usually used as a filling in chocolates or other sweets.

Varieties

European nut pralines 
Praline may have originally been inspired in France by the cook of Marshal du Plessis-Praslin (1602–1675), with the word praline deriving from the name Praslin. Early pralines were whole almonds individually coated in caramelized sugar, as opposed to dark nougat, where a sheet of caramelized sugar covers many nuts.
Although the New World had been discovered and settled by Europeans by this time, chocolate-producing cocoa from there was originally not associated with the term.  The European chefs used local nuts such as almonds and hazelnuts.

The powder made by grinding up such caramel-coated nuts is called pralin, and is an ingredient in many cakes, pastries, and ice creams. After this powder has been mixed with chocolate, it becomes praliné in French, which gave birth to what is known in French as chocolat praliné. The word praliné is used colloquially in France and Switzerland to refer to these various centres coated with chocolate, known simply as "chocolates" in English. In mainland Europe, the word praline is often used to mean either this nut powder or the chocolate paste made from it, which is widely used to fill chocolates, hence its use in Germany, the Netherlands, Belgium and the United Kingdom to refer to filled chocolates in general. In the United Kingdom, the term can refer either to praline (the filling for chocolates) or, less commonly, to the original whole-nut pralines.

American cream-based pralines 
French settlers brought the recipe to Louisiana, where both sugar cane and pecan trees were plentiful.  In 19th century New Orleans, people began substituting pecans for almonds, added cream to thicken the confection, and thus created what became known throughout the American South as the praline.

Pralines have a creamy consistency, similar to fudge. They are usually made by combining sugar (often brown), butter, cream or buttermilk, and pecans in a pot over medium-high heat, and stirring constantly until most of the water has evaporated and it has reached a thick texture with a brown color. This is then usually dropped by spoonfuls onto wax paper or a sheet of aluminum foil greased with butter, and left to cool.

"Pralines and Cream" is a common ice cream flavor in the United States and Canada. In New Orleans, Acadiana, and Baton Rouge, Louisiana, pralines are sometimes called "pecan candy".

See also 
 List of cookies
 List of desserts

References 

Cuisine of New Orleans
French cuisine
Nut confections
Almond desserts